PDFsharp is an open source .NET library for processing PDF files. 
It is written in C#. The library can be used to create, render, print, split, merge, modify, and extract text and meta-data of PDF files.

Features include images with transparency (color mask, monochrome mask, alpha mask), font embedding and subsetting, and graphical implementation based either on GDI+ or WPF.

See also 

 List of PDF software

Notes 
 PDFsharp is a registered trademark of empira Software GmbH, Kirchstraße 19, 53840 Troisdorf, Germany.

References 

Free PDF software